The Troad ( or ; , Troáda) or Troas (Trōiás or , Trōïás) is a historical region in northwestern Anatolia. It corresponds with the Biga Peninsula (Turkish: Biga Yarımadası) in the Çanakkale province of modern Turkey. Bounded by the Dardanelles to the northwest, by the Aegean Sea to the west and separated from the rest of Anatolia by the massif that forms Mount Ida, the Troad is drained by two main rivers, the Scamander (Karamenderes) and the Simois, which join at the area containing the ruins of Troy.

Mount Ida, called by Homer "many-fountain" (πολυπίδαξ), sourced several rivers, including Rhesos, Heptaporos, Caresus, Rhodios, Granicus (Granikos), Aesepus, Skamandros and Simoeis; these rivers were deified as a source of life by the Greeks, who depicted them on their coins as river-gods reclining by a stream and holding a reed.

History 

The Troad gets its name from the Hittites' name for the region, Taruiša. This identification was first put forth by Emil Forrer, but largely disputed by most Hittite experts until 1983 when Houwink ten Cate showed that two fragments were from the same original cuneiform tablet and in his discussion of the restored letter showed that Taruiša and Wiluša (Troy) were correctly placed in northwestern Anatolia.

Greek settlements flourished in Troas during the Archaic and Classical ages, as evidenced by the number of Greek poleis that coined money in their own names.

The region was part of the satrapy (province) of Hellespontine Phrygia of the Achaemenid Empire until its conquest by Alexander the Great. After this it fell to the Diadoch Seleucid Empire, and then passed to Rome's ally, the kingdom of Pergamon. The Attalid kings of Pergamon (now Bergama) later ceded Mysia, including the territory of the Troad, to the Roman Republic, on the death of King Attalus III in 133 BC.
 
Under the Roman Empire, the territory of the Troad became part of the province of Asia, and later of the smaller Mysian province Hellespontus; it was important enough to have suffragan bishoprics, including Pionia (now Avcılar).

Under the later Byzantine Empire, it was included in the thema of the Aegean Islands.
 
Following its conquest by the Ottoman Empire, the Troad formed part of the sanjak of Biga.

New Testament 
The apostles Paul and Silas first visited Troas during their journey from Galatia to Macedonia. The changes from the story, being recounted as "they" to "we" in Acts 16 and Acts 20, imply that Paul was joined by Luke when he went through Troas.

See also 
 Ancient regions of Anatolia
 Acts of Apostles
 Alexandria Troas
 List of traditional Greek place names

References

Sources 
 
 
 Trevor R. Bryce. Chapter 14, "The Trojan War: Myth or Reality" in The Kingdom of the Hittites. Oxford: Clarendon Press, 1998.

External links 
 

 
Ancient Greek geography
Ancient Greek archaeological sites in Turkey
Historical regions of Anatolia
Trojans
Peninsulas of Turkey